Interior Design is the fifteenth studio album by the American rock band Sparks, released in August 1988 by Fine Art Records.

Release
Interior Design did little in the way to reverse the commercial fortunes of the group, and did not appear on the album charts in the US or the UK. The singles "So Important" and "Just Got Back From Heaven" did better, both of which reached the top ten of the Billboard Hot Dance Music/Club Play chart at No. 8 and No. 7 respectively. "Just Got Back From Heaven" also appeared on the Hot Dance Music/Maxi-Singles Sales chart at No. 24.

Re-release
CD versions of the album included a number of bonus tracks including three versions of the LPs final track "Madonna", a remix of "So Important" and the short instrumental "The Big Brass Ring". In 2008, Sparks' own record label Lil' Beethoven Records reissued the album in a digipak sleeve retaining the bonus tracks.

Alternate title
For unknown reasons, Interior Design has been re-released multiple times in various European territories as a budget CD. The most common retitled version is Just Got Back From Heaven. However, many other versions have been released often utilising images of the mid-seventies Island-era iteration of the band. Other releases market the album as if it were a greatest hits album.

The alternate titles of Interior Design are as follows: Just Got Back from Heaven (Soundwings, Success, Hallmark Music & Entertainment), The World of the Sparks / Madonna (Trace Trading), So Important (Trend, LaserLight Digital), Gold (Gold), The Magic Collection (ABC Records).

Tour
Interior Design was the first Sparks album since 1979's No. 1 In Heaven that wasn't supported by live performances. However, they staged a promotional event called Love-O-Rama at the Tower Records store in Sherman Oaks, California on September 15, 1988.

Track listing

Personnel
 Russell Mael - vocals, production
 Ron Mael - keyboards, production
 Spencer Sircombe - guitar
 Pamela Stonebrooke - background vocals
 John Thomas - keyboards, engineering

References

Sparks (band) albums
1988 albums
Rhino Entertainment albums
Carrere Records albums
Synth-pop albums by American artists